1959 is the third studio album by Australian country musician Lee Kernaghan. It was released in July 1995 and became Kernaghan's first top ten album. It was nominated for the ARIA Award for Best Country Album at the ARIA Music Awards of 1996 and won "Album of the Year" at the 1996 Country Music Awards of Australia.

It was certified platinum in 1996.

Track listing
 "Scrubbashin'"
 "Janine"
 "Shake on It"
 "Country Crowd"
 "Doctor"
 "Rachel's Bed"
 "Where Country Is"
 "Freedom Road"
 "Skinny Dippin"
 "This Cowboys Hat"
 "The Rope That Pulls the Wind"
 "1959"

Charts

Weekly charts

Year-end charts

Certifications

References

1995 albums
Lee Kernaghan albums